The men's 200 metres event at the 2007 Summer Universiade was held on 12–13 August.

Medalists

Results

Heats
Qualification: First 4 of each heat (Q) and the next 4 fastest (q) qualified for the quarterfinals.

Wind: Heat 1: -1.8 m/s, Heat 2: +0.9 m/s, Heat 3: -0.2 m/s, Heat 4: -1.0 m/s, Heat 5: -0.7 m/s, Heat 6: -0.8 m/s, Heat 7: +0.2 m/s

Quarterfinals
Qualification: First 4 of each heat qualified directly (Q) for the semifinals.

Wind: Heat 1: -0.8 m/s, Heat 2: -0.1 m/s, Heat 3: -0.4 m/s, Heat 4: 0.0 m/s

Semifinals
Qualification: First 4 of each semifinal qualified directly (Q) for the final.

Wind: Heat 1: -0.8 m/s, Heat 2: -0.3 m/s

Final
Wind: +0.2 m/s

References
Results

200
2007